Alexander Engel, birth name: Kurt Engel (4 June 1902 – 25 July 1968) was a German film actor. He appeared in more than 70 films between 1932 and 1968. He was born in Berlin, Germany and died in Saarbrücken, West Germany. He chose the stage name "Alexander", to prevent confusion with the popular musician Kurt Engel.

Selected filmography

 Playing with Fire (1921)
 The Love Express (1931)
 Venetian Nights (1931)
 Hasenklein kann nichts dafür (1932) - Fritz - Bürodiener
 A Prince's Young Love (1933) - Kandidat Schmitt
 Music in the Blood (1934) - Klinkermann, erster Geiger
 Princess Turandot (1934)
 One Too Many on Board (1935) - Ingenieur Sparkuhl
 Savoy Hotel 217 (1936) - Fedor Fedorovich Daschenko
 Schlußakkord (1936) - Mr. Smith
 Under Blazing Heavens (1936) - Theater director
 White Slaves (1937) - Turbin
 Madame Bovary (1937) - Homais, Apoteker
 The Yellow Flag (1937) - Dr. Martinez - Arzt - Quarantäne-Sation
 Another World (1937) - Dr. Jerrys, Arzt
 Schüsse in Kabine 7 (1938) - Reverend Smith
 After Midnight (1938) - Wronski
 Ballade (1938) - Schattenwitz, des Herzog's Vater
 Sergeant Berry (1938) - Gomez
 War es der im 3. Stock? (1939) - Iwan, Diener
 The Green Emperor (1939) - Sekretär Favard
 Der vierte kommt nicht (1939) - Holmin, Privatsekretär
 Die Hochzeitsreise (1939) - Second Guest, the 'Drinker'
 Parkstrasse 13 (1939) - Diener Fedor
 The Curtain Falls (1939) - Cadoni
 Die fremde Frau (1939) - Samuli
 Brand im Ozean (1939) - Käpt'n Gold
 Commissioner Eyck (1940) - van Fliet
 Golowin geht durch die Stadt (1940) - Marisch, Redakteur
 Alarm (1941) - Barpianist Ölkers
 Vom Schicksal verweht (1942) - Prof.Forster
 Attack on Baku (1942) - Steffens, ein englischer Agent
 Sieben Briefe (1944) - Dr. Torda
 The Blue Swords (1949) - Herr von Tschirnhausen
 Und wenn's nur einer wär''' (1959) - Oberschulrat
 The Merry Wives of Windsor (1950) - Innkeeper Reich (Page)
 Heart of Stone (1950) - Lisbeths Oheim
 The Colourful Dream (1952)
 Hit Parade (1953) - Prof. Hochstätter
 Das Fräulein von Scuderi (1955) - La Regnie
 My Children and I (1955) - Herr Knirsch
 Ein Herz schlägt für Erika (1956)
 Winter in the Woods (1956) - Seifert
 Made in Germany (1957) - Kurator von Eggeling
 Das Glück liegt auf der Straße (1957) - Prof. Fruehauf
 Mischief in Wonderland (1957)
 A Time to Love and a Time to Die (1958) - Mad Air Raid Warden
 Taiga (1958) - Sazarin
 Mandolins and Moonlight (1959)
 The Return of Dr. Mabuse (1961) - Prof. Griesinger
 The Strange Countess (1961) - Patient
 The Indian Scarf (1963) - Rev. Hastings
 Der Henker von London (1963)
 Long Legs, Long Fingers (1966) - Arzt
 The Hound of Blackwood Castle (1968) - Doc Adams
 Death and Diamonds (1968) - Owner of Minicars Racing Center (uncredited)
 Two Undercover Angels'' (1969) - Albert Carimbuli

References

External links

1902 births
1968 deaths
Male actors from Berlin
German male film actors
20th-century German male actors